Maxi Gnauck (born 10 October 1964) is a retired artistic gymnast who represented East Germany. With a total of 27 medals at the Olympic Games, World Championships, World Cups, and European Championships she is considered one of the most successful woman gymnasts that Germany has ever produced. In 1980 she was selected East German Sportspersonality of the Year.

Her parents were expecting a boy and they planned to name him Max so, when the baby turned out to be a girl, they simply added an 'i', creating an uncommon name for Germany. When Maxi was five, her mother took her to a gymnastics centre in their area.  By age eight, Maxi had won her first medals at the Kreisspartakiade. When she was nine she changed her club to SC Dynamo Berlin, where she was coached by Jürgen Heritz. Considered one of the best uneven bars competitors of all time, Maxi was also an excellent tumbler.  She was one of the first female gymnasts to perform a triple twist on floor.

In April 1986, Maxi officially announced her retirement and began a four-year course in sports coaching at the University of Leipzig. In 1988 she was severely injured while sliding down a waterslide while working as an aide at a children's summer camp by the Baltic Sea. She broke her C5 vertebra and was nearly paralysed. Three vertebrae were later reinforced with a metal plate.

Facing a strong competition after the reunification of East Germany and West Germany, she first took temporary coaching positions in South Africa and Great Britain, both for a few months in 1990. From 1993 until 2004 she worked as a full-time coach at the Harksheide Gymnastics Center in Norderstedt near Hamburg. Since 2005 she has worked at the Artistic and Apparatus Gymnastics Center (Kunst- und Gerätturnzentrum) at Liestal in Switzerland. In 2000, she was inducted into the International Gymnastics Hall of Fame. She is the first German gymnast to be awarded that honour.

Results

See also
List of top medalists at the World Artistic Gymnastics Championships

References

External links

Maxi in Switzerland

1964 births
Living people
Gymnasts from Berlin
People from East Berlin
German female artistic gymnasts
Gymnasts at the 1980 Summer Olympics
Olympic gymnasts of East Germany
Olympic gold medalists for East Germany
Olympic silver medalists for East Germany
Olympic bronze medalists for East Germany
Olympic medalists in gymnastics
Medalists at the 1980 Summer Olympics
World champion gymnasts
Medalists at the World Artistic Gymnastics Championships
European champions in gymnastics
20th-century German women